Isabella Fraser (15 November 1857 in Largs, Ayrshire, Scotland – 24 November 1932) was a New Zealand matron.

References

1857 births
1932 deaths
People from Largs
19th-century New Zealand people
Scottish emigrants to New Zealand